First Universalist Church of Sharpsville is a historic Universalist church located at 131 N. Mercer Avenue in Sharpsville, Mercer County, Pennsylvania, United States.  The church was built between 1882 and 1884, and is a richly decorated brick and stone church building in a High Victorian Gothic style.  It measures 52 feet by 42 feet and the interior takes the Akron plan.  The property includes the parsonage; a two-story Queen Anne style dwelling built in 1888.

It was added to the National Register of Historic Places in 2003.  The Sharpsville Area Historical Society purchased the building in 2000 and is in the process of restoring it.  The building serves as the Society's headquarters.

References

Churches on the National Register of Historic Places in Pennsylvania
Gothic Revival church buildings in Pennsylvania
Churches completed in 1884
19th-century Unitarian Universalist church buildings
Religious buildings and structures in Mercer County, Pennsylvania
Unitarian Universalist churches in Pennsylvania
Universalist Church of America churches
Akron Plan church buildings
National Register of Historic Places in Mercer County, Pennsylvania